Hurricane Ida generated a tornado outbreak as it traversed the Southeastern, Mid-Atlantic, and Northeastern United States. Thirty-five confirmed tornadoes touched down from Mississippi to Massachusetts; one person was killed in Upper Dublin Township, Pennsylvania, and several people were injured in Alabama, New Jersey, and Pennsylvania. The most active and destructive part of the outbreak occurred during the afternoon of September 1, when several strong tornadoes struck Maryland, New Jersey, and Pennsylvania, including an EF3 tornado which impacted Mullica Hill, New Jersey.

The same storm later dropped an EF1 tornado that prompted a tornado emergency for Burlington, New Jersey and Croydon, and Bristol, Pennsylvania, the first of its kind in the Northeast, as well as the first such alert associated with a tropical cyclone. This outbreak severely impacted New Jersey and the Philadelphia Metropolitan Area, a region which had been significantly impacted by strong tornadoes from another outbreak that occurred just over a month prior, as well as several weak tornadoes from the remnants of Tropical Storm Fred two weeks earlier. Overall, the 35 tornadoes killed one person and injured seven others.

Meteorological synopsis

Strong low-level shear, daytime boundary heating, and weak inland buoyancy led to an increasing risk for tornadoes across the Southeastern United States. The Storm Prediction Center (SPC) issued a slight risk for severe weather for the Central Gulf Coast for three straight days between August 29-31. Numerous weak tornadoes touched down in Mississippi, Louisiana, and Alabama during this time. One EF1 tornado caused considerable damage in Saraland, Alabama on August 30, injuring three people. A small slight risk was also issued in the Mid-Atlantic (United States) for the Southern Delmarva Peninsula on August 31, where a confluence zone was expected to have an increasing westerly mid-level flow in response to Ida, although it was not the only influence in this area. Two weak tornadoes occurred in Southwest Virginia that afternoon.

As Ida became extratropical and moved into the Northeastern United States on September 1, a strengthening low-level jet (LLJ) along and south of a warm front coupled with a very moist atmosphere and sufficient surface heating led to a more substantial risk for tornadoes between Washington D.C. and New York City and the SPC issued a tornado-driven enhanced risk for severe weather for this region. This included a 10% tornado risk with a 30% damaging wind risk added later on. That afternoon, several supercells formed across the D.C. metropolitan area and quickly became tornadic as they moved northeast. An EF2 tornado struck Annapolis, Maryland, causing significant structural and tree damage throughout the city. Another EF2 tornado caused severe damage in a residential neighborhood in Oxford, Pennsylvania. Later, a large EF2 tornado struck Upper Dublin Township, Pennsylvania, severely damaging buildings, homes, and trees, killing one person and causing a few minor injuries. An intense EF3 wedge tornado destroyed several homes and a dairy farm in Mullica Hill, New Jersey as well, injuring two people. A few other weak tornadoes also touched down later that evening and into September 2 before the remnants of Ida moved offshore, ending the outbreak.

Confirmed tornadoes

August 29 event

August 30 event

August 31 event

September 1 event

September 2 event

Fort Washington–Horsham, Pennsylvania

This rain-wrapped, strong tornado touched down near the Philadelphia Cricket Club southwest of Whitemarsh at 5:35 p.m. EDT (21:25 UTC), where minor low-end EF1 tree damage occurred. Additional minor damage occurred to homes and trees in and around Fort Washington State Park. The tornado strengthened to high-end EF1 intensity as it moved through Whitemarsh, crossed the Pennsylvania Turnpike, and moved into a more residential area as it entered Fort Washington, where many trees were snapped and numerous homes sustained minor to moderate roof and siding damage. The tornado then rapidly intensified and reached its peak intensity of high-end EF2 as it crossed PA 309 in Upper Dublin. Numerous homes and apartment buildings sustained partial to total loss of their roofs, and one sustained collapse of some exterior walls. Almost all trees in this area were uprooted or snapped, and cars were flipped or damaged by flying debris. Upper Dublin High School sustained roof damage, a building adjacent to the school lost a significant portion of its roof, and power poles were snapped. 

Homes near the school were damaged, and one woman was killed when a large tree fell onto her house on Kenyon Drive. The tornado weakened to high-end EF1 strength as it continued to move to the northeast, flattening a wide swath of trees in a wooded area and causing severe roof damage to buildings on the campus of Temple University Ambler. Homes were damaged in a nearby neighborhood as well, a few of which also had large sections of roofing torn off. Many additional trees were downed, and mostly minor roof damage to homes, commercial buildings, and a veterinary hospital occurred in Maple Glen before the tornado quickly dissipated near the Bucks County line in the Horsham area 5:49 p.m. EDT (21:49 UTC). Damage totaled $5 million.

Cedar Grove–Mullica Hill–Wenonah–Deptford, New Jersey

This intense wedge tornado caused major damage as it paralleled Route 45 to its west in Gloucester County. It first touched down at 6:10 p.m. EDT (22:10 UTC), east-southeast of Harrisonville, initially causing minor tree damage. Tree damage became more significant as it moved northeast into the eastern side of Cedar Grove, and dozens of trees were downed at EF1 intensity in the small community. The tornado became strong and destructive as it struck the Willow Oaks subdivision at the northeast edge of Cedar Grove, where multiple homes sustained significant structural damage on Marvin Lane. Roofs were ripped off, exterior walls were collapsed, vehicles were moved and damaged, and one home was left with only a few walls left standing, with the damage in this area being rated EF3. The tornado then weakened momentarily as it struck a commercial farm along Route 77 at the south edge of Mullica Hill, destroying barns and storage buildings at EF1 to EF2 intensity before strengthening again and moving through a subdivision in the eastern part of town. 

The large tornado reached its peak intensity of mid-range EF3 at this location as it moved over Salvatore Lane and Clems Run. Several two-story homes sustained total roof and exterior wall loss in this area, and cars were tossed around. One house was completely leveled, though it was not well-anchored and nearby trees did not sustain damage consistent with a tornado stronger than EF3 strength. Crossing US 322 past Mullica Hill, the tornado maintained its strength it destroyed barns and silos at a large dairy farm, and completely mowed down a wide swath of large trees as it moved through a wooded area. In the worst affected area, every tree in the direct path was snapped near the base. The tornado then briefly weakened to EF1 intensity before regaining EF2 intensity as it moved into the Mantua Township and passed west of Barnsboro, where many trees were downed, homes sustained roof damage, and a large commercial greenhouse was partially destroyed. Continuing to the northeast, it remained at EF2 strength as it impacted Wenonah, where garages were destroyed, a fire station was damaged, and some homes had roofs and exterior walls ripped off. 

The tornado then narrowed and gradually weakened, causing mostly minor damage to trees, fences, roofs and siding occurred in Woodbury Heights and Deptford before dissipating at 6:30 p.m. EDT (22:30 UTC). Two people were injured. This was the first F3/EF3 rated tornado in the state of New Jersey since 1990, and one of only four ever confirmed in the state. Damages exceeded $64 million, although the official estimate from the National Centers for Environmental Information is $5 million.

Gallery

See also

 List of North American tornadoes and tornado outbreaks
 Hurricane Isaias tornado outbreak
 Hurricane Rita tornado outbreak
 Hurricane Katrina tornado outbreak

Notes

References

Hurricane Ida
Tornadoes of 2021
F3 tornadoes
Tornadoes in Alabama
Tornadoes in Mississippi
Tornadoes in Virginia
Tornadoes in Maryland
Tornadoes in New Jersey
Tornadoes in Pennsylvania